George Cornwall (by 1509–1562), of Berrington, Herefordshire, English Bicknor, Gloucestershire and Stanage, Radnorshire, was an English politician.

He was a Member (MP) of the Parliament of England for Herefordshire in 1539. He was the son of Herefordshire MP, Richard Cornwall.

References

1562 deaths
English MPs 1539–1540
People from Herefordshire
People from Gloucestershire
People from Radnorshire
Year of birth uncertain